Ceratomyxa whippsi is a myxosporean parasite that infects gall-bladders of serranid fishes from the Great Barrier Reef. It was first found on Cephalopholis boenak.

References

Further reading
Abdel-Baki, Abdel-Azeem S., et al. "Morphology, seasonality and phylogenetic relationships of Ceratomyxa husseini n. sp. from the gall-bladder of Cephalopholis hemistiktos (Rüppell)(Perciformes: Serranidae) in the Persian Gulf off Saudi Arabia." Systematic parasitology 91.1 (2015): 91–99.

External links

Animal parasites of fish
Veterinary parasitology
Animals described in 2009
Ceratomyxidae